"Sleepless Nights (Never Let Her Go)" is the fourth single from Faber Drive's debut album Seven Second Surgery. The song is about a family in which the father is abusive to his wife. The song hit the top 4 of the MuchOnDemand Daily 10 within the first month of release.

Music video
The music video shows a child, mother and father. The child wakes up in the middle of the night due to his parents fighting. The father gets mad over small things and usually directs his anger at his wife. Anytime the father yells, the child goes up to their room and watches in terror. He quickly manages to retreat back to his room before his father catches him. However, when he's finally caught, the father pins him to the wall and angrily tells him never to do it again. This finally results in his son and wife leaving him. The video features Canadian Idol winner Brian Melo.

Due to the realistic portrayal of domestic violence, the video ended with a black screen displaying two toll-free phone numbers (one of which is Kids Help Phone) for counseling regarding on personal issues. It was shot in Vancouver.

External links
https://www.youtube.com/watch?v=tRfz6Tfm2OE (making of the video with Brian Melo and the band)
https://web.archive.org/web/20090108052645/https://www.youtube.com/watch?v=xpQAmeTlbTI

2008 singles
Faber Drive songs
Rock ballads
Songs written by Brian Howes
2007 songs
Universal Records singles